Jinshanqiao is a subdistrict of Wangcheng district, Changsha, Hunan, China. It is located on the center of West Wangcheng, the subdistrict is bordered by Wushan, Huangjinyuan subdistricts to the northwest, Leifeng to the southwest, Baishazhou, Gaotangling to the east.

History
Jinshanqiao was formed by the revocation of Huangjin (and setting up three new subdistricts) in 2012.

In June 2012, Huangjin was changed from a town as a subdistrict. On August 28, 2012, Huangjin was divided into three subdistricts, they are Jinshanqiao, Huangjinyuan and Liaojiaping subdistricts. 
 The Jinshanqiao subdistrict contains Jinping, Jinshanqiao and Tonglin'ao three residential communities.
 The Huangjinyuan subdistrict contains Guifang, Huangjinyuan and Yingxiongling three villages.
 The Liaojiiaping subdistrict contains Baima, Liaojiaping and Sanyi three villages. Liaojiaping was merged to Leifeng subdistrict on November 19, 2015.

References

Township-level divisions of Wangcheng
Wangcheng